Cyrtodactylus ngopensis is a species of gecko endemic to India.

References

 http://reptile-database.reptarium.cz/species?genus=Cyrtodactylus&species=ngopensis

Reptiles of India
Cyrtodactylus
Reptiles described in 2022